Hertzian may refer to:

 Hertzian antenna
 Hertzian cone, the cone produced when an object passes through a solid, such as a bullet through glass
 Hertzian contact stress, localized stresses that develop as two curved surfaces come in contact and deform slightly under imposed loads
 Hertzian dipole, defined as a finite oscillating current over an infinitesimal length at a specified position
 Hertzian wave, the original name of radio waves
 Hertzian wave telegraphy